Live From New Zealand is a live high quality video album (DVD) and PBS Great Performances special by Christchurch, New Zealand soprano Hayley Westenra and featured duet with baritone Teddy Tahu Rhodes and soprano Sophie Westenra. It was recorded in St. James Theatre, Wellington and published in 2004.

The special consists mostly of songs from her debut international album, Pure and some bonus videos:"I Dreamed a Dream"(live in concert), "Pokarekare Ana", "100% Pure New Zealand" and "interviews from her family, neighbours and Christchurch school teachers".

Track listing

References

External links
 Hayley Westenra's official site
 Hayley Westenra International

Hayley Westenra albums
2004 live albums
2004 video albums
Live video albums
Decca Records live albums
Decca Records video albums